2000 is the second solo studio album by American rapper Grand Puba. It was released on June 20, 1995, through Elektra Records. Recording sessions took place at Soundtrack Studios, Platinum Island Studios, Battery Studios, V. Dubbs Studios, Acme Recording Studios, Fiber Studios, and Chung King Studios in New York. Production was handled by Mark Sparks, Minnesota, DJ Alamo, Chris Liggio and Dante Ross. The album peaked at number 48 on the Billboard 200 and at number 5 on the Top R&B/Hip-Hop Albums in the United States.

The album spawned two singles: "I Like It (I Wanna Be Where You Are)" and "A Little of This". Its lead single, "I Like It (I Wanna Be Where You Are)", reached #91 on the Billboard Hot 100, #68 on the Hot R&B/Hip-Hop Songs, #21 on the Hot Rap Songs, and was featured in the soundtrack for the video game Tony Hawk's Underground 2. The album's second single, "A Little of This" featuring backing vocals from Kid, made it to #90 on the Hot R&B/Hip-Hop Songs and also #21 on the Hot Rap Songs.

Track listing

Notes
Track 2 contains elements from "I Like It", written by Eldra Patrick DeBarge, William Randall DeBarge and Etterlene DeBarge, and performed by DeBarge; "I Wanna Be Where You Are", written by Eldra Patrick DeBarge, William Randall DeBarge, Etterlene DeBarge, Arthur "T-Boy" Ross and Leon Ware, and performed by DeBarge; "Never My Love", written by Donald Addrisi and Richard Addrisi, and performed by Cal Tjader
Track 3 contains samples from "Just a Love Child", written by Larry Mizell and performed by Bobbi Humphrey
Track 7 contains portions of "Tomorrow", written by George Johnson, Louis E. Johnson and Siedah Garrett, and performed by The Brothers Johnson
Track 9 contains a sample of "I Can Deliver" as performed by Grady Tate

Personnel
Maxwell Dixon – vocals
Michelle Valdes Valentin – vocals (tracks: 1, 5)
Christopher P. Reid – backing vocals (track 3)
Rick Posada – drum programming (track 6)
Mark Sparks – producer (tracks: 1-3, 5)
Mark Richardson – producer (tracks: 6, 7, 9)
Keith Jones – producer (tracks: 8, 10)
Chris Liggio – producer (track 4)
Dante Ross – producer (track 11)
John Kogan – engineering & mixing (tracks: 1, 9), recording (tracks: 8-10)
Andy Blakelock – engineering & recording (tracks: 1, 3, 5), mixing (tracks: 3, 8, 10)
Mike Scielzi – engineering & assistant recording (tracks: 1, 5), assistant mixing (track 3)
Chris Barnett – engineering & mixing (track 2)
Troy Hightower – engineering & recording (tracks: 2, 6, 9)
Vance Wright – engineering & recording (tracks: 2, 3)
Armen Mazlumian – engineering & assistant recording (track 2)
Derrick Garrett – engineering (track 4)
Jack Hersca – engineering & mixing (tracks: 5, 6, 11), recording (track 11)
Jay Nicholas – engineering & assistant mixing (tracks: 5, 6)
Joe Mendelson – engineering & recording (track 6)
Kevin Thomas – engineering (track 7)
Thomas Coyne – mastering
Jennifer Roddie – design
Jerome Lagarrigue – illustration
Joshua Jordan – photography

Charts

References

External links

1995 albums
Grand Puba albums
Elektra Records albums
Albums produced by Dante Ross
Albums recorded at Chung King Studios